Eschata gelida is a moth in the family Crambidae. It was described by Francis Walker in 1856. It is found in Sikkim and Darjeeling in India.

References

Chiloini
Moths described in 1856